Radio fréquence Jura (RFJ) is a private French-language radio broadcaster in regional Switzerland.  It broadcasts in the Canton of Jura, in La Chaux-de-Fonds and part of the Bernese Jura.

Its studios are based in Delémont.

External links 
 

French-language radio stations in Switzerland